The Stark Covered Bridge is a historic wooden covered bridge over the Upper Ammonoosuc River in Stark, New Hampshire. It carries a connecting roadway which joins the Northside Road to New Hampshire Route 110. The bridge was built in either 1857 or 1862 (sources differing), replacing a floating bridge that had been located a short way upstream. It is a two-span Paddleford truss bridge, which is a regional variant of the Long truss. The shore ends of the bridge rest on abutments of granite stone, while the center of the bridge is supported by a reinforced concrete pier, which is flared on the upstream side to deflect debris. The bridge is reinforced with steel beams, giving it a carrying capacity of 15 tons. It is decorated with pendant acorn finials and painted bright white.

When originally built, the central pier was also of granite, but it was washed away, along with the bridge, in 1890 or 1895. The bridge survived the disaster, and was placed again on its abutments, and reinforced with laminated arches that were thought to eliminate the need for a central pier. This configuration survived until 1946, when sagging in the bridge prompted construction of a temporary wooden central pier. The bridge was rebuilt in 1954, adding the present concrete pier and the steel stringers, and removing the laminated arches.

The bridge was listed on the National Register of Historic Places in 1980.

See also

 List of bridges on the National Register of Historic Places in New Hampshire
 List of New Hampshire covered bridges
 National Register of Historic Places listings in Coos County, New Hampshire

References

External links
 
 Stark Bridge, NH Division of Historical Resources

Covered bridges on the National Register of Historic Places in New Hampshire
Bridges completed in 1857
Wooden bridges in New Hampshire
Tourist attractions in Coös County, New Hampshire
Bridges in Coös County, New Hampshire
National Register of Historic Places in Coös County, New Hampshire
Road bridges on the National Register of Historic Places in New Hampshire
1857 establishments in New Hampshire
Long truss bridges in the United States